Maharaja Sir Rajendra Narayan Singh Deo KCIE (31 March 1912 – 23 February 1975) was an Indian politician and the last ruler of the princely state of Patna in Odisha before Indian independence in 1947. He was the President of the Ganatantra Parishad political party from 1950 to 1962 and the President of the Odisha state unit of the Swatantra Party after its merger with the Ganatantra Parishad in 1962. He was the Chief Minister of Orissa from 1967 to 1971.

Early life

Rajendra Narayan Singh Deo was born to Raja Aditya Pratap Singh, the ruler of the princely state of Seraikela and Rani Padmini Kumari Devi. He was adopted by Maharaja Prithwiraj Singh Deo of Patna state. He studied in the Mayo College in Ajmer and the St. Columbia's College in Hazaribagh. He became the Maharaja of Patna state in 1924 and assumed full powers in 1933. He was appointed a Knight Commander of the Order of the Indian Empire (KCIE) in the 1946 New Year Honours list. In 1948, the princely state of Patna was merged with the Union of India.

Political career
In 1951, Rajendra Narayan Singh Deo was elected to the 1st Lok Sabha from Kalahandi Bolangir constituency in Odisha as a Ganatantra Parishad candidate.

In 1957, he was elected to the Odisha Legislative Assembly from Titlagarh constituency and became the leader of the opposition in the Odisha Legislative Assembly. After the fall of the minority Congress government, the Ganatantra Parishad formed a coalition government with the Congress on 22 May 1959. Rajendra Narayan Singh Deo became the finance minister in this government. The coalition government collapsed on 21 February 1961 and the President's rule was imposed. In 1961, he was re-elected to the Odisha Legislative Assembly from Kantabanji constituency.

In 1967, he was re-elected to the Odisha Legislative Assembly from Bolangir constituency and became the Chief Minister of Odisha on 8 March 1967. He led a coalition government formed by the Swatantra Party and the Orissa Jana Congress of Harekrushna Mahatab. He resigned from the office on 9 January 1971 and on 11 January 1971 the President's rule was imposed. In 1971 and 1974, he was re-elected to the Odisha Legislative Assembly from the same constituency.

Notes

External links
 Maharaja R N Singh deo's official website

1912 births
1975 deaths
People from Balangir district
People from Kalahandi district
People from Odisha
Leaders of the Opposition in Odisha
Chief Ministers of Odisha
India MPs 1952–1957
Swatantra Party politicians
Knights Commander of the Order of the Indian Empire
Indian knights
All India Ganatantra Parishad politicians
Odisha MLAs 1967–1971